This article provides two lists:
A list of National Basketball Association players by total career regular season assists recorded
Progressive assist leaders list

Assist leaders
This is a list of National Basketball Association players by total career regular season assists recorded.
Statistics accurate as of March 16, 2023.

Progressive list of assists leaders
This is a progressive list of assists leaders showing how the record increased through the years.
Statistics accurate as of March 16, 2023.

See also
Basketball statistics
NBA regular season records

Notes

References

External links
Basketball-Reference.com enumeration of NBA career leaders in assists
National Basketball Association official website enumeration of NBA career leaders in assists

National Basketball Association statistical leaders